John Joseph "Sadie" McMahon (September 19, 1867 – February 20, 1954) was a professional baseball player who played pitcher in the Major Leagues from 1889 to 1897. McMahon played for the Philadelphia Athletics, Baltimore Orioles, and the Brooklyn Bridegrooms.

McMahon was born in Wilmington, Delaware and grew up in the Henry Clay Village area.  In 1954, McMahon died and was buried in St. Joseph on the Brandywine Church Cemetery in Wilmington.  He was inducted into the Delaware Sports Museum and Hall of Fame in 1979.

See also
 List of Major League Baseball annual strikeout leaders

Sources

Philadelphia Athletics (AA) players
Baltimore Orioles (NL) players
Brooklyn Bridegrooms players
1867 births
1954 deaths
Major League Baseball pitchers
19th-century baseball players
Baseball players from Wilmington, Delaware
Baltimore Orioles (IL) players
Norristown (minor league baseball) players
Baltimore Orioles (Atlantic Association) players